Say I Do is a 2004 Spanish screwball comedy film directed and written by Juan Calvo.

Plot 
Víctor Martínez is a shy 36-year-old man working as an usher at a movie theater. He still lives with his mother. By some mistake, he ends up in a reality show with Estrella Cuevas, an aspiring actress. They win the contest and are sent off to spend some time together at a luxury hotel at Oropesa del Mar. According to their contract, they have to get married and not divorce for at least three years, otherwise the contract is annulled and they have to give back their winning of €253,000. Víctor eventually falls in love with Estrella.

Cast

Release 
Distributed by Columbia TriStar, the film was theatrically released in Spain on 12 November 2004.

See also 
 List of Spanish films of 2004

References

External links 
 
 

2004 films
Spanish romantic comedy films
2000s Spanish-language films
2000s Spanish films
2000s screwball comedy films